Justice John Erhenede (born 26 June 1986) is a Nigerian footballer who plays as an attacking midfielder for FC Sønderborg.

References

External links
 
 
 Profile on kolding-fc.dk

Living people
1986 births
Sportspeople from Warri
Association football midfielders
Nigerian footballers
Nigerian expatriate footballers
F.C. Ebedei players
FC Midtjylland players
Vejle Boldklub players
Kolding FC players
Hobro IK players
HB Køge players
Kolding IF players
Danish Superliga players
Expatriate men's footballers in Denmark
Nigerian expatriate sportspeople in Denmark
Danish 1st Division players
Danish 2nd Division players
FC Sønderborg players